= John Schwarzmantel =

John Schwarzmantel is an English political scientist who has worked for many years in the broad area of political theory. His principal focus has been on the links between ideas and practice; that is on how ideologies map onto political movements and parties. The aim of his work is to support the realisation of democratic ideals in practice. He has worked for many years at the University of Leeds.

== Selected publications ==
- Schwarzmantel, J. (2014). The Routledge guidebook to Gramsci's prison notebooks. Routledge.
- Schwarzmantel, J. (2011). Democracy and political violence. Edinburgh University Press.
- McNally, M., & Schwarzmantel, J. (2009). Gramsci and global politics. Londan and New York: Routledge.
- Schwarzmantel, J. J. (2008). Ideology and politics. Sage
- Schwarzmantel, J. (2003). Citizenship and identity: Towards a new republic. Routledge.
- Schwarzmantel, J. J. (1991). Socialism and the Idea of the Nation, Hemel Hempstead: Harvester Wheatsheaf
